Streptocarpus albus is a species of flowering plant in the family Gesneriaceae, native to Tanzania. It was first described in 1933 as Saintpaulia alba. It is found in the Uluguru and Nguru mountains of Tanzania.

References

albus
Endemic flora of Tanzania
Plants described in 1933